Taractrocera is a genus of skippers in the family Hesperiidae.

Species
Taractrocera anisomorpha (Lower, 1911)
Taractrocera archias (Felder, 1860)
Taractrocera ardonia (Hewitson, 1868)
Taractrocera ceramas (Hewitson, 1868)
Taractrocera danna (Moore, 1865)
Taractrocera dolon (Plötz, 1884)
Taractrocera flavoides Leech, 1893
Taractrocera fusca de Jong, 2004
Taractrocera ilia Waterhouse, 1932
Taractrocera ina Waterhouse, 1932
Taractrocera luzonensis (Snellen, 1889)
Taractrocera maevius (Fabricius, 1793)
Taractrocera nigrolimbata (Snellen, 1889)
Taractrocera papyria (Boisduval, 1832)
Taractrocera tilda Evans, 1934
Taractrocera trikora de Jong, 2004

Biology 
The larvae feed on Gramineae including Bambusa, Oryza

References

Natural History Museum Lepidoptera genus database
Taractrocera at funet

Taractrocerini
Hesperiidae genera